The men's 15 kilometre classical cross-country skiing competition at the 2006 Winter Olympics in Turin, Italy, was held on 17 February at Pragelato.

Each skier started at half a minute intervals, skiing the entire 15 kilometre course. Pietro Piller Cottrer was the 2005 World champion, though he did it in freestyle. The defending Olympic champion was the Estonian Andrus Veerpalu, who won in Salt Lake. There had been three World Cup events in this competition: German Tobias Angerer won the first in November, Vasily Rochev of Russia won in Estonia in January, and Jens Arne Svartedal won in Davos a week and a half before the games. However, neither of the World Cup winners took the gold in Turin, as defending champion Veerpalu peaked at the right time to win by 14 seconds.

Results
Martin Tauber, an Austrian skier, originally placed 8th, but was disqualified after the IOC declared him permanently ineligible for doping-related violations.

The race was started at 10:00.

References

Men's cross-country skiing at the 2006 Winter Olympics
Men's 15 kilometre cross-country skiing at the Winter Olympics